Cuddon is a surname. Notable people with the surname include:

J. A. Cuddon (1928–1996), English author, dictionary writer, and school teacher
Peter Cuddon (disambiguation), multiple people
Robert Cuddon (disambiguation), multiple people